The New-York Mirror was a weekly newspaper published in New York City from 1823 to 1842, succeeded by The New Mirror in 1843 and 1844. Its producers then launched a daily newspaper named The Evening Mirror, which published from 1844 to 1898.

History
The Mirror was founded by George Pope Morris and Samuel Woodworth in August 1823. The journal was a weekly publication, and it included coverage of arts and literature in addition to local news. Circulation flagged in the 1840s and at the end of 1842 the paper was closed. In 1843 Morris partnered with popular writer Nathaniel Parker Willis to revamp the business, and together they relaunched the newspaper as The New Mirror, which published weekly for eighteen months. They then established The Evening Mirror in 1844.

In all three incarnations, the paper employed many well known literary figures of the day. The Mirror'''s September 2, 1843 issue saw the publication of "Ben Bolt" by Thomas Dunn English, which was soon to attain widespread popularity. Edgar Allan Poe worked for the newspaper as a critic until February 1845. In the January 29, 1845 issue, the Mirror was the first to publish Poe's poem "The Raven" with the author's name.  In his introduction to the poem, Willis called it "unsurpassed in English poetry for subtle conception, masterly ingenuity of versification, and consistent, sustaining of imaginative lift... It will stick to the memory of everybody who reads it." Willis and Morris left the publication in 1846.

After Willis, the newspaper was edited by Hiram Fuller, a noted enemy of Poe. Fuller published attacks on Poe made by Charles Frederick Briggs and Thomas Dunn English in May and June 1846. A letter printed by the Mirror in the July 23, 1846 issue caused Poe to sue the newspaper for libel and defamation of character. Poe won the suit and was awarded $225.06 as well as an additional $101.42 in court costs.

References

External links

 The New-York Mirror (New York, NY) at Edgar Allan Poe Society of Baltimore
 The New-York Mirror Volume I–XIX at HathiTrust (duplicates of a given volume are scanned from different originals and vary in quality):

 The New-York Mirror (New York, NY) at Google Books:

 The New Mirror'' Volume I–III at HathiTrust (six-month volumes, no indexes):

Defunct newspapers published in New York City
Edgar Allan Poe
1823 establishments in New York (state)
Publications established in 1823
Weekly newspapers published in the United States